Sesara is a genus of air-breathing land snails, terrestrial pulmonate gastropod mollusks in the subfamily Macrochlamydinae of the family Ariophantidae.

Species
 Sesara annamitica (Möllendorff, 1900)
 Sesara ataranensis (Theobald, 1870)
 Sesara bouyei (Crosse & P. Fischer, 1863)
 Sesara diplodon (Benson, 1859)
 Sesara episema Ponsonby, 1894
 Sesara galea (Benson, 1859)
 Sesara globosa Godwin-Austen, 1918
 Sesara harmeri Gude, 1900
 Sesara infrendens (Gould, 1843)
 Sesara ingrami Blanford, 1880
 Sesara melagodon W. T. Blanford, 1902
 Sesara parva Solem, 1966
 Sesara penoti Ancey, 1898
 Sesara polita Vermeulen, Luu, Theary & Anker, 2019
 Sesara pylaica (Benson, 1856)
 Sesara sesarella Vermeulen, Luu, Theary & Anker, 2019
 Sesara triodon Tanmuangpak & S. Tumpeesuwan, 2017
Synonyms
 Sesara bidenticulata (Benson, 1852): synonym of Philalanka bidenticulata (Benson, 1852) (superseded combination)
 Sesara daghoba (W. T. Blanford & H. F. Blanford, 1861): synonym of  Philalanka daghoba (W. T. Blanford & H. F. Blanford, 1861) (superseded combination)
 Sesara pirrienana (Reeve, 1854): synonym of  Philalanka pirrieana (Reeve, 1854) (superseded combination)
Taxa inquirenda
 Sesara hungerfordiana Theobald, 1876 
 Sesara inermis Theobald, 1876
 Sesara mouleyitensis Gude, 1901

References

External links
 Albers, J. C.; Martens, E. von. (1860). Die Heliceen nach natürlicher Verwandtschaft systematisch geordnet von Joh. Christ. Albers. Ed. 2. Pp. i-xviii, 1-359. Leipzig: Engelman

Ariophantidae